At the Purple Onion is a live album by Don Francks, Lenny Breau, and Eon Henstridge that was recorded in 1962 and released in 2004. They performed as a trio called Three.

History
Breau's former manager kept the original tapes of this live performance for over 40 years before they were re-discovered. It features Breau, Francks, and Henstridge with Joey Hollingsworth — one vocal and also tap dancing — performing at the Purple Onion club in Toronto, Ontario, Canada. Liner notes and commentary by Francks, Hollingsworth, George B. Sukornyk and Ron Forbes-Roberts are also included.

Reception

Allmusic  critic Ken Dryden notes that while "fans of Lenny Breau are likely to be interested in all of his previously unreleased recordings, the focus is primarily on Francks...some listeners may feel a bit overwhelmed by the emphasis on Francks' comedic vocals and narratives."

JazzTimes critic Russell Carlson writes that Breau's "comping hangs in the background on this less-than-even recording. But when Breau gets space to himself, he uses it like a Breau fan wants him to... Serious Breau collectors and fans of wacky jazz theater (do any exist?) will invest wisely in this; those uninitiated in Breau's artistry should turn to Art of Life's previous The Hallmark Sessions."

Track listing
 "Introduction" – 2:29
 "A New Electric Chair" (Lenny Breau, Don Francks, Eon Henstridge) – 3:14
 "The Surrey with the Fringe on Top" (Oscar Hammerstein II, Richard Rodgers) – 5:26
 "The Newspaper Song" (Breau, Francks, Henstridge) – 9:17
 "Gum Addiction" (Breau, Francks, Henstridge) – 4:09
 "Tea for Two" (Irving Caesar, Vincent Youmans) – 13:18
 "A Gentile Sings the Blues" (Breau, Francks, Henstridge) – 21:04
 "Work Song" (Nat Adderley) – 5:14
 "Oscar's Blues" (Oscar Moore) – 1:53
 "Joey's Solo" (Joey Hollingsworth) – 1:43

Personnel
Lenny Breau – guitar
Don Francks – vocals
Eon Henstridge – bass
Joey Hollingsworth – vocals on "Work Song", tap dancing on "Work Song", "Oscar's Blues" and "Joey's Solo"
Production notes:
Paul Kohler – producer, art direction, mastering, mixing, graphic layout, liner notes

References

External links
lennybreau.com discography entry
Art of Life Records web site
All About Jazz reissue announcement for At the Purple Onion
 Entry at discogs.com

Don Francks albums
Lenny Breau albums
2004 live albums